The length of a train may be measured in number of wagons (for bulk loads such as coal and iron ore) or in metres for general freight. Train lengths and loads on electrified railways, especially lower voltage 3000 V DC and 1500 V DC, are limited by traction and power considerations. Drawgear and couplings can also be a limiting factor, along with curves, gradients and crossing loop lengths.

Additional locomotive units enable much longer, heavier loads without the increased risks of derailing that stem from the stress of pulling very long chains of train-cars around curves.

Bulk  

 Australia
BHP iron ore train has typically 268 cars and a train weight of 43,000 tonnes carrying 24,200 tonnes of iron ore, 2.8 km long, two SD70ACe locomotives at the head of the train and two remote controlled SD70ACe locomotives as mid-train helpers. 
 BHP used to run 44,500-tonne, 336-car long iron ore trains over 3 km long, with six to eight locomotives including an intermediate remote unit. This operation seems to have ceased since the trunk line was fully double tracked in May 2011.
 The record-breaking ore train from the same company, 682 cars and 7,300 m long, once carried 82,000 metric tons of ore for a total weight of the train, largest in the world, of 99,734 tonnes. It was driven by eight locomotives distributed along its length to keep the coupling loads and curve performance controllable.
Leigh Creek coal—2.8 km, 161 wagons and two locomotives.
 Cane tramway – 75 wagons ( gauge).
Brazil
Carajás Railway  gauge iron ore trains are typically 330 cars long, totaling 3 km in length.
VLI  Grain with 160 hopper cars, or 80 hoppers plus 72 FTTs (for pulp transport) totaling about 3.2 km (2 miles) long.
 China
 Datong–Qinhuangdao railway is a dedicated coal-transport railway. Each typical train hauls 20,000 tons of coal using 210 wagons and two HXD1 locomotives, with total length . 
 India
Indian Railways operated the longest train in India on 15 August 2022.
Indonesia (proposed)
Muara Wahau coal to Bengalon port – 2.196 km
 Mauritania
 Iron ore trains on the Mauritania Railway are up to 3 kilometres (1.9 mi) in length. They consist of 3 or 4 diesel-electric EMD locomotives, 200 to 210 cars each carrying up to 84 tons of iron ore, and 2-3 service cars.
 South Africa
Sishen–Saldanha railway line ore trains on  – 4.1 km
Ukraine
 12,000 tonnes

General  

  – United States – Trains are limited by air brake capability. electronically controlled pneumatic braked (180 wagons) – AAR Standard S-4200.
  – France – intermediate locomotive – trial
  – The Bangalore–Dharmavaram goods train (India)
 
 The Netherlands–Germany—trial trains of this length
 Saudi Arabia 1000 m double stack
  — In Denmark and to Hamburg, Germany; 2 locomotives and 82 waggons.

Passenger 

 Australia – The Ghan, running the 2,979 km from Adelaide to Darwin, was lengthened to 44 coaches totalling 1,096 m for nine weeks from May 2016.
Canada - Canadian (Via Rail) runs 4,466 km from Toronto to Vancouver and can be as long as 30 cars in the summer months, though more regularly it operates with 18 to 22 cars with up to three F40PH-2D locomotives.

Special test runs 
These are one-off runs, sometimes specifically to set records.

Bulk (ore, coal etc)
  Datong–Qinhuangdao railway, China.
  Sishen–Saldanha, South Africa. The train comprised 16 locomotives (9 Class 9E 50 kV AC electric and 7 Class 37 diesel-electric).
  Bulk coal train from Ekibastuz to the Urals, Soviet Union, 20 February 1986.
  Norfolk and Western Railway unit coal train from Iaeger, West Virginia to Portsmouth, Ohio, 15 November 1967.

General cargo 
  Union Pacific, United States. Around 618 double-stacked containers were carried at speeds up to 70 mph/112 km/h. 14,059 t.
  BNSF, United States, 2010—

Passenger 
  Kijfhoek–Eindhoven, Netherlands. In 1989, the Nederlandse Spoorwegen (Dutch Railways) celebrated their 150th anniversary. On 19 February 1989, NS ran a test train with 60 passenger cars ( long and weighing 2,597 tons), of which only the first 14 cars held actual passengers, pulled by one 1500 V DC locomotive. Twenty years later, in 2009, Railz Miniworld repeated the stunt on a smaller scale, inside their exhibition in Rotterdam.
  Ghent–Ostend, Belgium. On 27 April 1991, one electric locomotive and 70 passenger cars (totalling  and 2786 tons, excluding the locomotive) held a charity run for the Belgian Cancer Fund, exceeding the Dutch record.
  Rhaetian Railway, Switzerland. On 29 October 2022, the Rhaetian Railway celebrated the 175th anniversary of Swiss railways with an hour-long,  journey from Preda to Alvaneu in southeast Switzerland.

See also 

 Distributed power—Where operational considerations or economics require it, trains can be made longer if intermediate locomotives are inserted in the train and remotely controlled from the leading locomotive.
 High-speed rail
 Track gauge
 Extreme Trains on the History Channel 2009
 List of steepest gradients on adhesion railways
 International Heavy Haul Association
 Longest road trains

References 

Trains
Rail freight transport
Rail transport-related lists of superlatives